Duck Creek Township is one of fourteen townships in Madison County, Indiana, United States. As of the 2010 census, its population was 548 and it contained 240 housing units.

History
Duck Creek Township was organized in 1852. It takes its name from a stream in the southeastern part.

Geography

Cities, towns, villages
 Elwood (north edge)

Unincorporated towns
 College Corner at 
 Leisure at 
(This list is based on USGS data and may include former settlements.)

Cemeteries
The township contains Waymire Cemetery.

Major highways
  Indiana State Road 37

Education
 Elwood Community School Corporation
 Madison-Grant United School Corporation

Duck Creek Township residents may obtain a free library card from the North Madison County Public Library System with branches in Elwood, Frankton, and Summitville.

Political districts
 Indiana's 6th congressional district
 State House District 35
 State Senate District 20

References
 
 United States Census Bureau 2008 TIGER/Line Shapefiles
 IndianaMap

External links
 Indiana Township Association
 United Township Association of Indiana
 City-Data.com page for Duck Creek Township
 Duck Creek Township History

Townships in Madison County, Indiana
Townships in Indiana